Russell Arden Hodge (born September 12, 1939) is an American track and field athlete, world record holder in decathlon (1966–1967), Olympic competitor from 1964, and silver medalist from the Pan American Games (1971).

Track and field career
Hodge competed at the 1963 Pan American Games in São Paulo, where he finished 4th in decathlon. He competed in decathlon at the 1964 Summer Olympics in Tokyo, where he placed ninth. In July 1966 he set a world record in decathlon at a competition in Los Angeles, with 8,230 points, a record which lasted until May 1967. Hodge received a silver medal in decathlon at the 1971 Pan American Games in Cali, Colombia with a score of 7314, behind winner Rick Wanamaker.

He finished fourth in the AAU National Championship in decathlon in 1963 and in 1964, and second in 1965 and 1966. In 1970 he finished second again, as he did in 1971, after a close race with Rick Wanamaker.

Hodge did not compete at the Olympics after 1964. He became injured before the U.S. trials both in 1968 and 1972, and again in 1976.

Family
Hodge is son of Alice Arden, who placed ninth in high jump at the 1936 Summer Olympics in Berlin. His father Russel "Rusty" Hodge was a semi-professional basketball player, playing center for the Liberty Emeralds.

Awards
In August 2003, both Hodge and his mother were honoured with the Sullivan County Historical Society "History Maker" award. They are the only mother-son Olympians in the United States' Olympic history.

References

External links

1939 births
Living people
American male decathletes
Athletes (track and field) at the 1964 Summer Olympics
Olympic track and field athletes of the United States
Athletes (track and field) at the 1963 Pan American Games
Athletes (track and field) at the 1971 Pan American Games
World record setters in athletics (track and field)
Pan American Games medalists in athletics (track and field)
Pan American Games silver medalists for the United States
Medalists at the 1971 Pan American Games
People from Rockland, New York